Stephen G. Rhodes (born 1977) is an artist based in Los Angeles.

Biography
Rhodes was born in Houston and raised in Louisiana.  His work consists of multi-media installations which reference stories from American history.  The work is often concerned with language and puns.

He received his MFA from Art Center College of Design, Pasadena, in 2005.

Selected exhibitions
2007

 Ruined Dualisms, Overduin and Kite, Los Angeles
 Recurrency, Guild & Greyshkul, New York
 Galerie Christian Nagel, curated by Sterling Ruby, Berlin
 USA Today, The State Hermitage Museum, St. Petersburg, Russia (travelling)
 Between Two Deaths, curated by Ellen Blumenstein and Felix Ensslin. ZKM Center for the Arts and Media, Karlsruhe

2006

 Dualism #2, ArtRock, Rockefeller Center, New York, New York

2005

 LA Weekly Biennial, curated by Doug Harvey, Track 16, 
Los Angeles

2004

 Faith, curated by Matthew Johnson, Champion Fine Art, Culver City, California 
 
2001

 Entropy, curated by James Fuentes, Brooklyn, NY 
 Wolf Songs for Lambs, curated by James Fuentes, The Space, New York

References

External links
Stephen G. Rhodes at Vilma Gold, London www.vilmagold.com 
Further information at Overduin and Kite [WWW.OVERDUINANDKITE.COM]
Images, texts and biography from the Saatchi Gallery
Stephen G. Rhodes at ArtFacts.net

American artists
Living people
1977 births